Leorin Loch is of the impounding variety, located 2.5 kilometres north of Port Ellen, and is one of a group of three lochs supplying water to the island. The earthfill dam is 1.5 metres high.

See also
 List of reservoirs and dams in the United Kingdom

Sources
"Argyll and Bute Council Reservoirs Act 1975 Public Register"

Reservoirs in Argyll and Bute